Bárbara Ofelia Sánchez Rivas (born 23 April 1987) is an Ecuadorian former footballer who played as a centre back. She has been a member of the Ecuador women's national team.

International career
Sánchez capped for Ecuador at senior level during the 2006 South American Women's Football Championship.

References

External links

1987 births
Living people
Women's association football central defenders
Ecuadorian women's footballers
Sportspeople from Guayaquil
Ecuador women's international footballers
21st-century Ecuadorian women